"Between the Devil and the Deep Blue Sea" is an American popular song published in 1931, with music by Harold Arlen and lyrics by Ted Koehler, and first recorded by Cab Calloway in 1931. It was introduced in the 1931 Cotton Club show Rhythmania and is now a widely recorded standard.

Early hits
Joel Whitburn identified the most successful early recordings as being by:

 Cab Calloway recorded October 21, 1931 for Brunswick Records (catalogue No. 6209)
 Louis Armstrong performed a version featuring a trumpet solo which was recorded on January 25, 1932 and released by Columbia Records, catalogue No. 2600D.
 The Boswell Sisters with The Dorsey Brothers (Recorded March 21, 1932, Brunswick Records, No. 6291)

Other notable recordings
1930 Jack Payne and his BBC Orchestra included in his album Roamin' Thru' the Roses, Vol. 6. 
1932 Kate Smith recorded January 28, 1932 for Columbia Records with Blues in My Heart interpolated.
1935 Benny Goodman and orchestra (July 1, 1935 for Victor) with Helen Ward on lead vocal
1939 Count Basie (recorded November 7, 1939) featuring Helen Humes as vocalist and Lester Young on tenor saxophone
1937 Phil Harris recorded it for Vocalion Records on Feb. 27, 1937.
1955 Ella Fitzgerald – included in her album Sweet and Hot.
1956 Dick Haymes – recorded for his album Moondreams.
1957 Buddy Rich performed the song on his album Buddy Rich Just Sings
1957 Bing Crosby included it in the album New Tricks.
1957 Carmen McRae for her album After Glow.
1958 Lee Wiley for her album A Touch Of The Blues.
1958 Perry Como included in the album Saturday Night with Mr. C.
1960 Bobby Darin recorded a version influenced by Latin music in Feb. 1960, released in 1964 on the album Winners.
1961 Ella Fitzgerald recorded it for her 1961 Verve album Ella Fitzgerald Sings the Harold Arlen Songbook
1961 Joni James for her album The Mood Is Romance.
1964 Mel Tormé on his self-titled album.
1967 Thelonious Monk played the song on his 1967 album, Straight, No Chaser
1993 Diana Krall – an instrumental version was included on her album Stepping Out.
1993 Chris Rea played the song on his 1993 album, Espresso Logic
2002 George Harrison on his posthumous final album, Brainwashed
2010 Paolo Nutini with the Preservation Hall Jazz Band on the album An Album to Benefit Preservation Hall & The Preservation Hall Music Outreach Program

Film appearances
1933 Sing, Bing, Sing – Bing Crosby sang an abridged version of the song in this Mack Sennett short.
1969 They Shoot Horses, Don't They? – An instrumental version is played during one of the dance scenes.
1984 City Heat – sung by Eloise Laws.

Broadway show
Featured in the 2013 show After Midnight.

Mentions in other media
Almost borrowed sentence in the Edguy song "Wash away the Poison" from the 2001 album Mandrake a line of "Between the devil and the deep sea" is sung, clearly inspired by this song.

References

Pop standards
Songs with music by Harold Arlen
Songs with lyrics by Ted Koehler
1931 songs
Cab Calloway songs
George Harrison songs
Songs released posthumously